Catcon is an Australian construction and civil engineering company based in Adelaide, South Australia. It was rated at #50 in South Australia's "Top 100 companies" in 2015. Catcon is the company responsible for the Bolivar interchange and Little Para River Bridge section of the Northern Connector freeway in Adelaide.

References

Construction and civil engineering companies of Australia
Companies based in South Australia